War Machine (born Jonathan Paul Koppenhaver, November 30, 1981) is an American former professional mixed martial artist, former pornographic actor, and incarcerated felon. He is currently serving a life sentence for multiple counts of rape, kidnapping, domestic battery, and other charges.

Koppenhaver/Machine had a 14–5 overall record in mixed martial arts fighting in various MMA promotions, including Bellator and the UFC, the latter for a short period. He competed in the welterweight division. He was a fighter on The Ultimate Fighter: Team Hughes vs. Team Serra as part of Team Serra and also competed for Bellator MMA, Tachi Palace Fights, BAMMA, and the Xtreme Fighting Championships.  In 2008, he legally changed his name to War Machine. He also appeared in several pornographic films.

In March 2017, he was convicted on 29 felony counts after raping and battering his ex-girlfriend Christine Mackinday, as well as battering her boyfriend at the time during an incident in 2014. On June 5, 2017, he was sentenced to life in prison with the possibility of parole after 36 years. He will be 72 years old when he is eligible for parole in 2053.

Early life
Koppenhaver was born in the Los Angeles suburb of Simi Valley, California. His German-American father was an officer for the Los Angeles Police Department. His Mexican-American mother worked as a nurse and later became a work-at-home mother. Due to his mother's drug addiction, Koppenhaver would often take care of his younger brother and sister. When he was 13, Koppenhaver suffered a horrific trauma when he unsuccessfully performed cardiopulmonary resuscitation (CPR]) on his father after he suffered a heart attack.

In August 2000, Koppenhaver attended The Citadel in Charleston, South Carolina for two years, but was expelled for "poor behavior". While attending, he majored in biology. In an interview, Koppenhaver claimed that he had been earning high marks at The Citadel.

Mixed martial arts career

The Ultimate Fighter Season Six
Koppenhaver was a fighter on The Ultimate Fighter: Team Hughes vs. Team Serra, fighting on Team Serra. He was not part of the original 16 fighters.  Instead, Koppenhaver was brought in as a replacement when Roman Mitichyan broke his elbow during evaluations and was sent home. Koppenhaver lost by unanimous decision to Tom Speer.

After a dispute with TNA Wrestling over the use of his nickname, he legally changed his name from "Jon Koppenhaver" to "War Machine" in 2008.

Ultimate Fighting Championship
In War Machine's official UFC debut, he defeated Jared Rollins in The Ultimate Fighter: Team Hughes vs Team Serra Finale via KO at 2:01 of the third round. War Machine and Rollins both received $25,000 due to winning fight of the night honors and War Machine winning knockout of the night. His last UFC fight was at UFC 84 against Yoshiyuki Yoshida which he lost via submission in the first round.

He was released from the UFC after rejecting a fight offered by UFC matchmaker Joe Silva, and after comments made about the death of fellow UFC fighter Evan Tanner. War Machine posted on his Myspace that he believed that Tanner had gone to the isolated southern California desert to kill himself after he realized his career might have been over and basically had made no money during it. Medical examiners eventually proved that Tanner's death was not a suicide, but War Machine stood by his statements.

Bellator Fighting Championships
War Machine was signed and then released by Bellator Fighting Championships. His MySpace blog cited disparaging comments about Barack Obama as the cause for his non-participation in their upcoming tournament.

Independent promotions (2009–2011)
On June 20, 2009, War Machine was set to fight Roger Bowling. They were then set to fight at XFC 9 in Tampa, Florida on September 5, where it was to be the main event and would broadcast live over HDNet's website.

On September 5, 2009, War Machine stepped into the cage and faced off against Mikey Gomez. The ref stopped the fight, giving a somewhat controversial win to War Machine by TKO (punches), at 13 seconds in the third round. War Machine was scheduled to fight October 3, 2009 against Jacob McClintock, but cancelled the fight so he could fight on October 8, 2009, against David Mitchell.

On April 17, 2010, he was set to face Tex Johnson in the main event of Wild Bill's Fight Night. On April 16, TMZ.com reported that War Machine left a comment on his Twitter, stating he would not be turning up to the event for the fight.

Return to Bellator Fighting Championships
On December 7, 2011, it was announced that War Machine was re-signed to an exclusive deal with Bellator Fighting Championships and would be competing in its Season 6 Welterweight Tournament. War Machine was expected to fight Karl Amoussou in the opening round of the welterweight tournament at Bellator 63. War Machine was sentenced to a year in prison for the prior assault in Las Vegas, Nevada from December 2009 and was forced out of the bout and the tournament.

He was set to make his Bellator debut on January 17, 2013, against Paul Daley when he tore his ACL and broke his fibula which forced him out of the fight.

War Machine faced Blas Avena at Bellator 96 on June 19, 2013. He won via TKO due to punches in round one.

War Machine then took part in Bellator MMA's Season Nine Welterweight Tournament at Bellator 100 against Vaughn Anderson in the Quarterfinals. He won via technical submission due to a rear naked choke in the second round.

War Machine then faced Ron Keslar on October 18, 2013, at Bellator 104 in the semifinals of the Season Nine Welterweight Tournament. He lost via technical submission due to a rear naked choke in the first round.

On August 8, 2014, Bellator MMA announced the release of War Machine after he assaulted and raped his former girlfriend Christine Mackinday, known by her stage name Christy Mack.

Adult film career
On October 31, 2009, War Machine announced that he would pursue a career in pornographic films along with fighting mixed martial arts. In his announcement, War Machine revealed that he had signed with LA Direct Models and made his debut scene with pornographic actress Riley Steele. Between 2009 and 2010, War Machine appeared in thirteen adult films. War Machine was featured in the January 2014 issue of Hustler magazine in a nude pictorial with Christy Mack.

Arrests and convictions
On September 2, 2007, he was found guilty of striking a Las Vegas man in the face and choking him unconscious during a parking lot scuffle. In February 2008, he was sentenced to three years of probation and 30 days of community service, avoiding the possible felony charge and accompanying prison time.

On February 22, 2008, Koppenhaver pleaded guilty to a misdemeanor charge of assault and battery, and was fined and sentenced to probation.

In August 2010, Koppenhaver was sentenced to one year in the county jail for a felony assault conviction stemming from a fight at a Point Loma bar earlier in the year, as well as an additional fight at a bar in Pacific Beach, San Diego. He was imprisoned in San Diego's George Bailey County Detention Facility, mostly in solitary confinement. After going to jail, War Machine maintained his Twitter account as well as a blog documenting his time in jail. On February 1, 2012, it was announced via Koppenhaver's Twitter that he would be serving another year of jail time due to preceding events. He was released on October 29, 2012 after serving two years and two months. He was released out of solitary confinement.

Christine Mackinday case
Sometime in April 2013, Koppenhaver began dating adult film actress Christine Mackinday, better known by her stage name Christy Mack. Mackinday, nearly 10 years Koppenhaver's junior, was a leading figure in the adult film industry at the time. Their relationship, as described by Mackinday, was passionate, but she also described Koppenhaver as physically and mentally abusive, and controlling. The abuse got to a point where Mack ended their relationship in May 2014.

On August 8, 2014, Koppenhaver brutally assaulted Mackinday and her then boyfriend Corey Thomas in Mack's home in Las Vegas. He first went for Thomas and attacked him for 10 minutes. Koppenhaver then put Thomas in a chokehold, only to be let go after he was made to swear not to go to the authorities. After Thomas escaped, Koppenhaver then set himself on Mackinday, whom he assaulted for two full hours.

Mackinday was raped, severely beaten, and cut with a knife by Koppenhaver. Mackinday only managed to escape once Koppenhaver's back was turned, and once she managed to escape via the balcony, she went to the house of a neighbor, who promptly called 911. Mackinday was hospitalized, where it was found that she suffered from 18 broken facial bones, a broken nose, 12 missing teeth, a fractured rib and her liver was critically ruptured.

On August 15, Koppenhaver, who had managed to elude the authorities while on the run for a week, was apprehended after posting self-pitying tweets the entire time, which enabled authorities to easily trace the IP location of his cell phone, and made it far easier for them to track him. Koppenhaver was arrested in Simi Valley, California, by U.S. Marshals and Simi Valley police, and was then extradited to Nevada where he was charged with 36 felony counts, including multiple attempted murder, kidnapping, rape and sexual assault charges.

According to the Las Vegas Metropolitan Police Department, Koppenhaver was found unresponsive in his cell on October 14, 2014, at around 9:30 p.m. by a corrections officer conducting routine checks in the cells. The cell officer found Koppenhaver struggling to breathe, with a torn piece of linen around his neck that was tied to the leg of his bunk bed. After the officer cut the linen, Koppenhaver's vitals stabilized within 15 minutes, and he was moved to a medical ward, where he was placed on suicide watch. In a suicide note found in his cell, he quoted philosopher Friedrich Nietzsche twice to explain his actions. The incident occurred on the same day he was supposed to appear in court to discuss a plea deal.

His trial, originally scheduled for September 2015, was postponed twice before beginning in February 2017. On March 20, 2017, he was convicted on 29 of 36 felony counts, including kidnapping and sexual assault with a weapon, for which he faced life in prison. The jury deadlocked on two counts of attempted murder.

Koppenhaver was represented by Jay Leiderman and Brandon Sua. On June 5, 2017, Koppenhaver was sentenced to an aggregate sentence of life in prison with a possibility of parole after 36 years has been served. His earliest release date is in 2053.

Mixed martial arts record

| Loss
| align=center| 14–5
| Ron Keslar
| Technical Submission (rear-naked choke)
| Bellator 104
| 
| align=center| 1
| align=center| 3:31
| Cedar Rapids, Iowa, United States
| 
|-
| Win
| align=center| 14–4
| Vaughn Anderson
| Technical Submission (rear-naked choke)
| Bellator 100
| 
| align=center| 2
| align=center| 4:01
| Phoenix, Arizona, United States
| 
|-
| Win
| align=center| 13–4
| Blas Avena
| TKO (punches)
| Bellator 96
| 
| align=center| 1
| align=center| 3:55
| Thackerville, Oklahoma, United States
| 
|-
| Win
| align=center| 12–4
| Roger Huerta
| TKO (punches)
| UWF 1: Huerta vs. War Machine
| 
| align=center| 3
| align=center| 3:09
| Pharr, Texas, United States
| 
|-
| Loss
| align=center| 11–4
| John Alessio
| Technical Submission (rear-naked choke)
| TPF 5: Stars and Strikes
| 
| align=center| 3
| align=center| 2:24
| Lemoore, California, United States
| 
|-
| Win
| align=center| 11–3
| Zach Light
| Submission (rear-naked choke)
| BAMMA 3
| 
| align=center| 1
| align=center| 1:09
| Birmingham, England
| 
|-
| Loss
| align=center| 10–3
| David Mitchell
| Decision (split)
| TPF 1: Tachi Palace Fights 1
| 
| align=center| 3
| align=center| 5:00
| Lemoore, California, United States
| 
|-
| Win
| align=center| 10–2
| Mikey Gomez
| TKO (punches)
| XFC 9: Evolution
| 
| align=center| 3
| align=center| 0:13
| Tampa, Florida, United States
| 
|-
| Win
| align=center| 9–2
| Erick Montano
| Submission (armbar)
| Total Combat 33
| 
| align=center| 3
| align=center| 0:47
| Mexico City, Mexico
| 
|-
| Win
| align=center| 8–2
| Tim Woods
| Submission (rear-naked choke)
| UWC 6: Capital Punishment
| 
| align=center| 2
| align=center| 4:16
| Fairfax, Virginia, United States
| 
|-
| Win
| align=center| 7–2
| Guillaume DeLorenzi
| Submission (rear-naked choke)
| XMMA 7: Inferno
| 
| align=center| 1
| align=center| 4:13
| Montreal, Quebec, Canada
| 
|-
| Win
| align=center| 6–2
| David Anderson
| KO (punches)
| Desert Rage 4
| 
| align=center| 1
| align=center| 2:26
| Yuma, Arizona, United States
| 
|-
| Loss
| align=center| 5–2
| Yoshiyuki Yoshida
| Technical Submission (anaconda choke)
| UFC 84
| 
| align=center| 1
| align=center| 0:56
| Las Vegas, Nevada, United States
| 
|-
| Win
| align=center| 5–1
| Jared Rollins
| KO (punches)
| The Ultimate Fighter 6 Finale
| 
| align=center| 3
| align=center| 2:01
|Las Vegas, Nevada, United States
| 
|-
| Win
| align=center| 4–1
| RJ Gamez
| TKO (punches)
| Total Combat 16: Annihilation
| 
| align=center| 1
| align=center| 2:09
| San Diego, California, United States
| 
|-
| Loss
| align=center| 3–1
| Mike O'Donnell
| Submission (armbar)
| GFC: Team Gracie vs Team Hammer House
| 
| align=center| 2
| align=center| 4:02
| Columbus, Ohio, United States
| 
|-
| Win
| align=center| 3–0
| Andrew Ramirez
| TKO (corner stoppage)
| Total Combat 9
| 
| align=center| 1
| align=center| 1:08
| Tijuana, Baja California, Mexico
| 
|-
| Win
| align=center| 2–0
| Frank Duffy
| Submission (rear-naked choke)
| Total Combat 4
| 
| align=center| 1
| align=center| 0:25
| Tijuana, Baja California, Mexico
| 
|-
| Win
| align=center| 1–0
| Angel Santibanez
| TKO (punch)
| Total Combat 2
| 
| align=center| 1
| align=center| 1:00
| Tijuana, Baja California, Mexico
|

Championships and accomplishments
Ultimate Fighting Championship
Fight of the Night (One time)
Knockout of the Night (One time)

See also 
 Murder of Nadine Lott

References

External links
 
 
 
 
 

1981 births
Living people
21st-century American criminals
American male criminals
American male mixed martial artists
American male pornographic film actors
American mixed martial artists of Mexican descent
American people convicted of assault
American people convicted of kidnapping
American people convicted of rape
American people convicted of sexual assault
American people of German descent
American practitioners of Brazilian jiu-jitsu
American prisoners and detainees
American prisoners sentenced to life imprisonment
American rapists
American sportspeople convicted of crimes
American sportspeople of Mexican descent
Crime in Nevada
Criminals from California
Criminals from Nevada
Mixed martial artists from California
Mixed martial artists from Nevada
Mixed martial artists utilizing Brazilian jiu-jitsu
People acquitted of attempted murder
People awarded a black belt in Brazilian jiu-jitsu
People from Simi Valley, California
Prisoners and detainees of Nevada
Prisoners sentenced to life imprisonment by Nevada
Sportspeople from Ventura County, California
Ultimate Fighting Championship male fighters
Violence against women in the United States
Welterweight mixed martial artists